Franklin is a home rule-class city in and the county seat of Simpson County, Kentucky, United States. The county is located on the south central border of the state, and its population was 10,176 at the 2020 census.

Kentucky Downs, formerly known as Dueling Grounds Racetrack (owned by Corey Johnsen & Ray Reid), is located in Franklin on the Kentucky–Tennessee border. Kentucky Downs hosts the Kentucky Cup Turf Festival, a full card of world-class horse racing featuring four major turf stakes. Kentucky Downs also hosts year-round simulcasts for the Kentucky-Tennessee market.

History
Franklin was formally incorporated by the state assembly on November 2, 1820, on a  tract of land. This tract was purchased from William Hudspeth and was named for Founding Father Benjamin Franklin. The post office was established on September 29, 1822, with Robert W. Simpson as postmaster.

On March 1, 1968, Johnny Cash and June Carter Cash were married at the Franklin First United Methodist church by Reverend Leslie Chapman.

Climate
The climate in this area is characterized by hot, humid summers and generally mild to cool winters. According to the Köppen Climate Classification system, Franklin has a humid subtropical climate, abbreviated "Cfa" on climate maps.

Geography
Franklin is located at  (36.722487, -86.577566).

Demographics

As of the census of 2000, there were 7,996 people, 3,251 households, and 2,174 families residing in the city. The racial makeup of the city was 80.99% White, 16.76% African American, 0.21% Native American, 0.76% Asian, 0.10% Pacific Islander, 0.26% from other races, and 0.91% from two or more races. Hispanic or Latino of any race were 0.81% of the population.

There were 3,251 households, out of which 31.1% had children under the age of 18 living with them, 48.1% were married couples living together, 14.8% had a female householder with no husband present, and 33.1% were non-families. 29.5% of all households were made up of individuals, and 13.7% had someone living alone who was 65 years of age or older. The average household size was 2.39 and the average family size was 2.94.

In the city, the population was spread out, with 25.2% under the age of 18, 9.1% from 18 to 24, 28.5% from 25 to 44, 21.8% from 45 to 64, and 15.4% who were 65 years of age or older. The median age was 36 years. For every 100 females, there were 89.9 males. For every 100 females age 18 and over, there were 85.7 males.

The median income for a household in the city was $32,001, and the median income for a family was $38,807. Males had a median income of $30,955 versus $21,783 for females. The per capita income for the city was $16,467. About 10.9% of families and 13.7% of the population were below the poverty line, including 15.9% of those under age 18 and 18.1% of those age 65 or over.

Education
Public education in Franklin is administered by Simpson County School District, which operates Franklin Elementary School, Lincoln Elementary School and Simpson Elementary School, Franklin-Simpson Middle School and Franklin-Simpson High School as well as an alternative school called Franklin-Simpson High School West Campus.

Franklin Mennonite Elementary School and Faith Baptist Academy are private institutions.

Franklin has a public library, the Goodnight Memorial Library.

Notable people

 Joe Blanton (1980–), Major League Baseball pitcher, was raised in Franklin
 Marty Brown (1965–), country singer-songwriter born in Maceo and moved to Franklin in 2004
 Thomas Chisholm (1866-1960), Christian songwriter who wrote "Great is Thy Faithfulness", was born in Franklin
 Carolyn Denning (1927–2016), pediatrician and pioneer in cystic fibrosis treatment, grew up in Franklin
 Blanche Taylor Dickinson (1896–1972), poet
 James Earnest (1818–1900), member of the Wisconsin State Assembly and Wisconsin State Senate, was born in Franklin
 Brad M. Kelley (1956–), billionaire businessman, came from Franklin
 Carolyn Conn Moore (1904–1986) of Franklin was elected as the first woman to serve in the Kentucky Senate in November 1949, after a special election to replace her husband, the late J. Lee Moore, after his death.
 Kenny Perry (1960–), a retired PGA golfer with 14 wins on the PGA Tour, 10 wins on the Senior PGA Tour, including 4 senior majors, and was a member of the U.S. teams in 5 Ryder & President's Cups, spent most of his childhood in Franklin and continues to live there. Today he operates a golf course there, Kenny Perry's Country Creek course. 
 Joker Phillips (1963–), pro football player, was born and raised in Franklin; he attended, played football, and is a former head coach at the University of Kentucky. Current NFL coach
 Annie Potts (1952–), actress (Ghostbusters, Pretty in Pink, Designing Women, and Young Sheldon), was raised in Franklin and graduated from Franklin-Simpson High School in 1971. 

 Tony Randolph, member of the South Dakota House of Representatives

See also
 List of cities in Kentucky
 Mantell UFO Incident- Franklin has a roadside historical marker for this incident.

References

External links

 

Cities in Kentucky
Cities in Simpson County, Kentucky
County seats in Kentucky
1820 establishments in Kentucky
Populated places established in 1820